Sadri Usluoğlu (born 23 January 1908, date of death unknown) was a Turkish basketball player. He competed in the men's tournament at the 1936 Summer Olympics.

References

External links
 

1908 births
Year of death missing
Turkish men's basketball players
Olympic basketball players of Turkey
Basketball players at the 1936 Summer Olympics
Place of birth missing
Turkish football managers
Sportspeople from Basra
Turkish footballers
Robert College alumni
1987 deaths
Association football goalkeepers
Beşiktaş J.K. footballers
Beşiktaş J.K. managers
Beşiktaş men's basketball players